The Huntsville and Lake of Bays Transportation Company was a company chartered in 1895 to operate steamboats on the Lake of Bays, and a series of lakes connecting to Huntsville in the northern section of the Muskoka Lakes District of Ontario, Canada. The wholly owned Huntsville and Lake of Bays Railway ran a short line narrow gauge railway to connect steamboats operating on Lake of Bays and Peninsula Lake outside Huntsville, Ontario. Covering a vertical distance of  along the hilly  route, it was known as the "smallest commercially operated railway in the world".

The network, which eventually contained eight steamboats, a single locomotive and several hotels and lodges in the area, operated as a unit until 1959. At that time, increasing automobile use led to a rapid decline in laker traffic. The hotels were sold off one by one, but the company remained a legal entity until 1967. The railway was purchased by the town of St. Thomas in southern Ontario, where it was reassembled to become the Pinnifore Park Railway. During the 1980s it was purchased by a group of enthusiasts in Huntsville and returned north, operating today as the Portage Flyer.

History
The lakes and rivers of the Muskoka Lakes region have long been used for transportation by the Algonquian-speaking Anishinaabeg peoples, and they were heavily used by the first Europeans who visited the area. In the latter half of the 19th century, the land north of Barrie was being opened up for colonization via land grants. As roads were in poor condition or non-existent, the only reliable form of transportation was by steamboat. By 1875 a pair of locks and a canal had been built to bypass a series of rapids in the Muskoka River, allowing navigable access between Mary Lake and Huntsville. In 1886 another canal was built to connect from Fairy Lake to Peninsula Lake to the east.

A broken link in the chain of lakes served by the growing network existed between Lake of Bays and Peninsula Lake, which connected in turn to Fairy Lake and the town of Huntsville. The short distance between the two lakes was too steep to justify building a canal. A ridge down the middle adds another . This obstacle was initially overcome by the construction of a gravel road in 1887, but the steep terrain made shipping any heavy loads via buckboard very difficult.

Portage railway

George F. Marsh ran steamers on a number of lakes in the area, and in 1895 he bought out his major competitor, Alfred Denton. This left him in control of most of the commercial shipping on Lake of Bays and the lower Fairy, Mary and Peninsula lakes, which he incorporated as the Huntsville and Lake of Bays Transportation Company. That year, he received a charter to build an electric railway in the gap between Peninsula Lake and Lake of Bays, which would complete his network.

By 1900 no work on the electric railway had been carried out, and he reincorporated as the Huntsville and Lake of Bays Navigation Company with a separate charter for a railway as the Huntsville and Lake of Bays Railway. This company was allowed to raise up to $50,000 in shares, and would connect not only Peninsula Lake and Lake of Bays, but extend to the west end of Hollow Lake as well. Seeing a big future for the area, the original company reincorporated once again in 1902 as the Huntsville, Lake of Bays and Lake Simcoe Navigation Company, with a charter for shipping, "hotels, house boats, boarding houses, cottages and summer resorts".

Work had not commenced on the portage railway by this time, although its charter stipulated the undertaking was to be started within three years and completed within seven. Originally planned to use electric power and standard gauge, the plans changed to narrow gauge and steam power when two surplus locomotives and rolling stock became available from E.B. Eddy of Hull, Quebec. These had originally been built by H.K. Porter of Pittsburgh in 1888. Two coaches were built from horse-drawn streetcars of the Toronto Street Railway, modified so the seat backs could flip over so the passengers always sat facing the direction of travel. The crew also built two boxcars and three flatcars.

Construction finally began in September 1902, but proved more difficult than expected, and in 1903 the charter was extended another two years to allow time to complete it. In 1904, Marsh failed to get Federal funding to help complete it, but was given $10,000 provincial grant instead. Trains were operating after the close of navigation season in 1904, and the line officially opened as the Portage Railway in 1905. The second section to Hollow Lake was never completed, and the charter was amended to remove it in 1906.

Expansion

Marsh died in 1904, while work on the railway was still underway. The company was purchased in 1905 by Charles Orlando Shaw, owner of the Anglo-Canadian Leather Company in Huntsville and Bracebridge, which was the largest tannery in the British Empire. The tannery required huge amounts of wood for heating, and hemlock for tanning, and the Portage Railway became a major link in his supply chain. The company's charter was resigned in 1907, and over the next decade he expanded the shipping fleet considerably, before turning to hotel building.

Shaw began his hotel construction with the relatively small Wawa Hotel, which opened in 1908 on Norway Point on Lake of Bays. This was a success, and he turned his eye towards a much larger and more lavish destination. He purchased the  Bigwin Island from Ojibwe Chief Chevodin (Joseph Big Wind) in 1910, and built the 280 room Bigwin Inn in 1920. The Bigwin was a hit, and became well known in Muskoka for its entertainment.

Decline
By 1939, the effects of the Great Depression and the opening of other routes led to a decline in business. Peaking at eight steamers, the fleet now had only two. Shaw died in 1942 and the company passed to his son-in-law. The Bigwin Inn was sold in 1947 and the company was passed to Shaw's daughter, Pauline Gill. Operations were turned over to Carl McLennan in 1948, and he had moderate success replacing the now old steamships with modern motorboats.

The original Porter locomotives reached the end of their lives in 1948, and were sold to a collector, Cameron Peck of Chicago, and finally came to rest at the Harold Warp Pioneer Village in Minden, Nebraska. They were replaced by two much larger engines, one coal and one oil-fired, originally built by Montreal Locomotive Works in 1926. The  oil-fired engine proved to be too heavy and was put into storage. The coal-fired Engine 1 gave the train its new name, Portage Flier. This second life lasted into the 1950s, when the rise of automobile use cut the lake traffic, and the railway shut down in 1959.

Moving away, and back

With its closure, the railway track and single locomotive were moved to St. Thomas, Ontario, where they were used at the Pinafore Railway Park. In 1984 the locomotive was put up for sale, which coincided with increasing interest in the Huntsville area to revive the railway. The newly chartered Huntsville and Lake of Bays Railway Society purchased the entire set, initially planning to recreate the original line. However, cottage construction in the area made it impossible, and after considering a number of sites, they eventually decided to build a new site in partnership with the Muskoka Pioneer Village. The resulting Muskoka Heritage Place opened on 1 July 2000, with a  route.

Railway route
The Portage Railway began at what became known as South Portage Station, running south onto Lake of Bays on a dock with three spurs. The line ran north from this point, passing a water tank and then connecting to a small spur with a maintenance shed. Shortly north of the spur, the line turns almost due west to follow the northern shore of Osbourne's Lake, then turns roughly north again after a short distance.

The line continues north to a point just south of Peninsula Lake, where it turns to the west for a distance. This is a spur that forms a switchback; the train travels to the west onto this line, switches, and then travels back eastward into North Portage Station. Here there were two parallel spurs paralleling the south bank of the lake, and a more substantial station.

Sections of the original right-of-way remain visible at Muskoka Road 23, and a sort section of line has been restored at South Portage, along with the addition of historical plaques at both ends.

Steamboats
Through its existence, the company operated several steamboats (see table). At the time, the area was becoming a popular resort destination. Several large hotels operated on the Lake of Bays and on the lower lakes and the steamboat business grew to service them, connecting with the Grand Trunk Railway, at Huntsville. Steamboats operated on both sides of the portage. The lower lakes run started in Huntsville and ran east through Fairy Lake and into Peninsula Lake. After the trip on the portage railway, passengers boarded another steamboat for a trip on Lake of Bays. All the boats were powered by steam engines except the Iroquois II which used a diesel engine.

References

Citations

Bibliography

External links
Huntsville and Lake of Bays Railway Society
Rebirth of the Portage Flyer
Train information on Muskoka Heritage Place

Steamboats of Canada
Transport in Huntsville, Ontario
Rail transport in Huntsville, Ontario
3 ft 6 in gauge railways in Canada
Defunct Ontario railways
Portage railways